Tyler Madden (born November 9, 1999) is an American professional ice hockey center currently playing with the Ontario Reign in the American Hockey League (AHL) as a prospect under contract with the Los Angeles Kings in the National Hockey League (NHL). Madden was selected 68th overall by the Vancouver Canucks in the 2018 NHL Entry Draft.

Playing career
On February 17. 2020, Madden's rights along with Tim Schaller, a 2020 second-round pick, and a conditional 2022 fourth-round pick were traded to the Los Angeles Kings in exchange for Tyler Toffoli. On March 30, 2020, he signed a three-year entry-level contract with the Kings, forgoing his final two seasons of college eligibility.

Due to the delayed start of the 2020–21 North American season, Madden was loaned to Eisbären Berlin until the start of the season. However, before he could play a game, he was recalled due to injury.

Personal life
Tyler's father is John Madden who played 13 seasons in the NHL, most notably for the New Jersey Devils. Madden was born in Albany when his father was a member of the American Hockey League's Albany River Rats.

Career statistics

Regular season and playoffs

International

Awards and honors

References

External links
 

1999 births
American men's ice hockey centers
Ice hockey players from New York (state)
Living people
Northeastern Huskies men's ice hockey players
Ontario Reign (AHL) players
Sportspeople from Albany, New York
Tri-City Storm players
Vancouver Canucks draft picks
AHCA Division I men's ice hockey All-Americans